Gravity is a fictional superhero appearing in American comic books published by Marvel Comics. The character was created by Sean McKeever and Mike Norton, who wanted to create their own character inspired by the college-aged Spider-Man from the 1980s they grew up with.

Publication history
He first appeared in Gravity #1 (Aug. 2005) and was created by Sean McKeever and Mike Norton.

Gravity's first appearance was in his own limited series: Gravity #1-5 (2005), later released as a digest-formatted graphic novel as part of the Marvel Next imprint aimed at younger readers. In the same year, Gravity was featured in Marvel Holiday Special (2005) in a minor role.

The character's next appearance was in the crossover storyline Beyond! #1-6 (2006) which was followed up by related appearances in Fantastic Four #545-546 and #550 (2007) and Black Panther vol. 4 #27 (2007). Gravity then had minor appearances in Fantastic Four #556 (2008), Avengers: The Initiative #17-19 (2008–2009), Avengers: The Initiative Special #1 (2009), Fantastic Four #563 (2009), Avengers: The Initiative #25 (2009) and Avengers Academy #13 (2011).

A solo storyline in Age of Heroes #2 (2010) provided the prologue to Gravity's next appearance as a member of the Young Allies in Young Allies #1-6 (2010–2011) then later in Onslaught Unleashed #1-4 (2011). Gravity was prominently featured in the "Fear Itself" tie-in series Fear Itself: Youth in Revolt #1-6 (2011).

Fictional character biography
Greg Willis was born and raised in Sheboygan, Wisconsin. During the summer after his high school graduation, while on board his family's yacht, Greg is sucked into a mysterious black hole. He is found hours later by his parents, unharmed. After the incident, Greg finds that he is able to manipulate the gravitational force around his body and nearby objects. Looking to take advantage of his new powers, Greg moves east to New York City to study licensing and merchandising at New York University, and becomes a marketable member of the superhero community known as Gravity.

On his first outing, Gravity encounters a battle between Rage and Black Death. Unfortunately, Gravity accidentally mistakes Rage as a villain and allows Black Death to escape. His confidence begins to waver as life as a superhero proves tougher than he expects. But after he saves the life of a frail old woman, and meets new friends Lauren Singh and Frog, Gravity slowly becomes more confident in his double identity. His later battles prove to be more fruitful, defeating the likes of Rhino, Shocker, and Whirlwind. However, Black Death takes a special interest in Gravity, appearing numerous times to humiliate the new hero. Black Death then masquerades as a hero known as the Greenwich Guardian (Black Death's identity before becoming a supervillain) to further break Gravity's confidence and use him in a plot to destroy the university. Ultimately, his resolve is too strong for Black Death and the villain is defeated. After the battle, Gravity is congratulated by Spider-Man, filling him with confidence. Finally feeling accepted, Gravity begins a relationship with his friend Lauren and continues his superhero career. Gravity later revealed his double identity to Lauren.

Beyond
After defeating a villain called Brushfire, Gravity stumbles upon a mysterious structure in Central Park and is transported to an alien world where he meets Spider-Man, Henry Pym, the Wasp, Venom, Kraven, Firebird, and the Hood. A mysterious voice claiming to be the Beyonder explains to the gathered heroes and villains that they must slay their enemies to win their reward. During their attempts to survive the hostile alien world, the group meet Michael Collins, who helps them survive and come to the realization that the Beyonder has seemingly brought them together to evaluate them and see who wins in a battle amongst themselves. Eventually, the group battles one another, and Henry Pym emerges as the victor when he seemingly kills the other heroes and villains. He then deceives the Beyonder into revealing his true identity as the Stranger, and restores the rest of the group, who have been shrunk down using Pym Particles. An angered Stranger is about to destroy the group until Uatu appears. The presence of a Watcher unnerves the Stranger, who then allows the group to leave peacefully, and disappears. Without the Stranger's power, the planet begins to pull itself apart. Gravity uses his powers to hold the planet together and allows the rest of the group to escape. He uses the last of his power to join the group on the spaceship, but dies shortly afterwards. The remaining heroes and villains attend Gravity's funeral to pay their respects for his actions. Later, Uatu stands by Gravity's grave, waiting to witness a cosmic destiny.

Return and Initiative
When Gravity's grave is desecrated and his body is stolen, Michael Collins enlists the help of the new Fantastic Four (now consisting of Black Panther and Storm as well as the Human Torch and the Thing) to find his fallen comrade. Following a cosmic residue left behind at the graveyard, the team ventures into deep space to discover that Gravity's body has been stolen and resurrected by Epoch as the new Protector of the Universe. To protect Epoch from being consumed, Gravity empties his new cosmic-level powers into Galactus and returns to Earth to see his parents and Lauren once more. Later, when the Fantastic Four are fighting alongside Doctor Strange and the Silver Surfer to save Eternity from death, Uatu seeks out Gravity's help to act as a "scalpel" to cut out the infected portions of the universe, fulfilling his cosmic destiny. Uatu informs Gravity that his secret identity (revealed after his demise) has been magically restored.

Gravity later joins the Fifty State Initiative. After passing a leadership course, Gravity is made the leader of Nevada's Initiative team, the Heavy Hitters, where he is joined by Initiative graduates Hardball, Nonstop, and Telemetry.

The Heavy Hitters are one of the few teams not to be infiltrated by the Skrulls during their secret invasion of Earth. Gravity and the Heavy Hitters aid the rest of the Initiative to battle and defeat Skrulls posing as the Revolutionary, Equinox, Thor Girl and Great Lakes Avengers member Grasshopper. During the battle with the Skrull Grasshopper, Flatman invites Gravity to join his home-state team, which he quickly rejects. The surviving members of the Initiative (including Gravity) storm Camp Hammond and retake it from the Skrulls. When Hardball confesses to Komodo that he has been forced to become a HYDRA double agent, Komodo enlists Gravity and the rest of the Heavy Hitters to help free him. However, the plan backfires when Hardball feels betrayed by Komodo and his team. He forcibly quits the Initiative and joins HYDRA, swearing enmity to his former friends. After the Skrulls' secret invasion, when Norman Osborn gains control of the Initiative, Gravity is replaced as the leader of the Heavy Hitters with Prodigy. Gravity was transferred to Wisconsin as leader of the Great Lakes Avengers, much to his dismay.

Young Allies
With the fall of Osborn's Initiative, and the abolishment of the Superhuman Registration Act, Gravity quits the Great Lakes Avengers and considers giving up his position as a hero. While flying back to see his parents, Gravity attempts to save a young couple from a mysterious explosion. However, before he can get them to safety, the couple are killed by Warhead, a member of the anarchist terrorist group known as the Bastards of Evil. In retaliation, Gravity angrily beats the villain unconscious, and finds renewed reason to continue to be a hero.

Returning to his studies at New York University, Gravity finds himself with his friends Lauren and Frog once more. The return of Warhead and the Bastards of Evil, an anarchist group claiming to be the estranged children of supervillains, brings Gravity together with fellow hero and university student Firestar. However, their team-up isn't enough to stop Warhead from detonating his powers, killing himself and many others around him at Ground Zero. Becoming obsessed, Gravity struggles to keep up with his double life. He manages to see the errors of his ways with the help of Frog and Firestar respectively. Later, Gravity and Firestar team up with Nomad, Spider-Girl, and Toro to defeat Superior, the son of the Leader, the creator of the Bastards of Evil. Teaming-up with the Secret Avengers, Gravity and his new young allies fight the entity known as Onslaught, where he was forced to kill Nomad, who was revealed to be just a construct made by Onslaught himself so he could use the energy he had stored in her as an anchor to pull himself back into Earth-616, so that Onslaught could not return and destroy Earth.

Fear Itself
When Steve Rogers requests that Prodigy create a new Initiative of volunteers to combat the growing fear within the nation, Gravity is among the former Initiative members that answer the call. Accompanied by Firestar, Gravity is appointed as co-team leader of one of the sections. His former Heavy Hitters teammate Hardball, recognised as a hero once again due to his role in Camp H.A.M.M.E.R.'s downfall, taunts Gravity for his lack of leadership skills. When Hardball causes an explosion during a battle with Juggernaut, who was transformed into Kuurth: Breaker of Stone, in Las Vegas, Nevada, Gravity confronts him, blaming him for his carelessness. Komodo and Firestar quickly break it up. They later battle Thor Girl, when she regains her designate powers.

Spider-Island
During the Spider-Island storyline, the Young Allies are seen defending New York. On the Hudson River bridge, Gravity fights against the Spider-King. Venom arrived and fought the Spider-King, spotting Gravity and threw him in the air. Spider-King approached him and threatened to kill him if he did not step aside. Gravity fell down on the spider-beast and knocked him out. Working with the other Avengers, they are able to save New York. Gravity was among the many heroes attacked by Carrion who posed as the Superior Spider-Man (Otto Octavius's mind in Spider-Man's body).

Young Avengers
Gravity was among the group of young heroes who arrived when the Young Avengers called "Avengers Assemble". They were nicknamed Thin Spandex Line. Together they battled Mother, a dangerous inter-dimensional parasite.

Powers and abilities
After being sucked into a mysterious black hole, Greg Willis gained the ability to control gravitons in various ways. He can manipulate his own gravity, enabling him to fly and simulate superhuman strength. Gravity is able to attract or repel the weight of objects around himself.

Other versions

Marvel Zombies: Dead Days
Gravity has a minor cameo appearance in Marvel Zombies: Dead Days (2007). He is seen attempting to eat Nova who manages to evade him.

Marvel Apes
A primate version of Gravity appears in the Marvel Apes titles Marvel Apes: Evolution Starts Here #1 (2009) and Marvel Apes: Speedball Special #1 (2009).

What If?
Various alternative versions of Gravity appear in the What If? storylines What If? Secret Wars #1 (2009), What If? House of M #1 (2009), What If? Spider-Man of House of M #1 (2009), and What If? Secret Invasion #1 (2010) in minor and cameo roles.

League of Losers
Gravity appeared in Robert Kirkman's "League of Losers" storyline in Marvel Team-Up vol.3 #15-18 (2006). A group of heroes including Gravity, Darkhawk, Dagger, Araña, X-23, Sleepwalker, and Terror travel to the future to stop the villainous Chronok from stealing Reed Richards' time machine, thus preventing him from travelling to the present and killing all the heroes of Earth. During this time, Gravity sparks a relationship with X-23. With the help of Mutant 2099, a native of the future timeline, the group is able to defeat Chronok. However, they are unable to travel back to their original timeline and are forced to remain in the future. Gravity and the rest of the group accept their fate and take peace in the knowledge that they have saved the world, even if their sacrifice goes unnoticed.

In other media

Television
 Gravity has a non-voiced cameo appearance in Ultimate Spider-Man. He is seen in the episodes "Agent Venom" and "The Next Iron Spider" on Nick Fury's list of young superheroes which is copied by Taskmaster.

Reception
IGN praised the Gravity comics, comparing the comics favorably to the classic Spider-Man comics. The character of Gravity was awarded Best New Comic Character for 2005 by IGN.

Collected editions

References

External links
Gravity at Marvel.com

2005 comics debuts
Avengers (comics) characters
Fictional characters from Wisconsin
Marvel Comics mutates
Fictional characters with gravity abilities
Marvel Comics characters with superhuman strength
Marvel Comics male superheroes
Marvel Next
Characters created by Sean McKeever
Comics characters introduced in 2005